The 1934 Bowling Green Falcons football team was an American football team that represented Bowling Green State College (later renamed Bowling Green State University) in the Ohio Athletic Conference (OAC) during the 1934 college football season. In their 11th season under head coach Warren Steller, the Falcons compiled a 2–3–2 record (overall and against conference opponents), finished in 13th place out of 22 teams in the OAC, and were outscored by a total of 54 to 36. Robert Lewis was the team captain.

Schedule

References

Bowling Green
Bowling Green Falcons football seasons
Bowling Green Falcons football